Michel Jean Maurice Vautrot (born 23 October 1945 in Saint-Vit, Doubs) is a retired football (soccer) referee from France. He is mostly known for officiating five matches in the FIFA World Cup: two in 1982 and three in 1990. He refereed the Club World Cup final in 1983 on National Stadium Tokyo between Hamburg S.V. (West Germany) and Grêmio F.B.P.A. (Brazil). He refereed three matches in the European Championship, one in 1984 and two in 1988, including the final between the Soviet Union and the Netherlands. In addition, he refereed the 1986 European Cup Final between Steaua Bucharest and Barcelona.

In 1986, Roma president Dino Viola was banned by UEFA for bribing referee Vautrot with £50,000 prior to the European Cup semi-final 2nd leg between Roma and Dundee United in 1984. Roma were later to lose the final on penalties to Liverpool.

In the 1990 World Cup semi finals between hosts Italy and reigning champions Argentina, Vautrot mistakenly played 8 minutes in the first period extra time. He later explained that he had forgotten to check his watch.

Honours
Orders
Chevalier of the Ordre national du Mérite: 1983
Officier of the Ordre national du Mérite: 1996
Chevalier of the Légion d'honneur: 2006

References

External links
  Profile
 Jim McLean admits he feels sick after Roma chief reveals Italians bribed ref in 1984 European Cup semi-final 

1945 births
Living people
Sportspeople from Doubs
French football referees
FIFA World Cup referees
1990 FIFA World Cup referees
1982 FIFA World Cup referees
UEFA Euro 1984 referees
UEFA Euro 1988 referees
UEFA European Championship final referees
Knights of the Ordre national du Mérite
Officers of the Ordre national du Mérite
Chevaliers of the Légion d'honneur
AFC Asian Cup referees